The Campbell Times is the student-edited newspaper at Campbell University in Buies Creek, North Carolina.  The newspaper was established in 1925 and was originally known as Creek Pebbles until the current name was adopted in 1983.  The print edition is published monthly during the academic year in a tabloid format.  The newspaper has a circulation of 2,000 according to the Park Library at the University of North Carolina at Chapel Hill's School of Journalism and Mass Communications.

See also
List of newspapers in North Carolina

References

External links 
The Campbell Times homepage (2007 issues in PDF)

Campbell University
Student newspapers published in North Carolina